The Special Division is a division of the United States Court of Appeals for the District of Columbia Circuit.  28 U.S.C. § 49 (1982 ed., Supp. V) (Title VI of the Ethics in Government Act).  It consists of three circuit court judges or justices appointed by the Chief Justice of the United States.  One of the judges must be a judge of the DC Circuit, and no two of the judges may be named to the Special Division from a particular court.  The judges are appointed for 2-year terms, with any vacancy being filled only for the remainder of the 2-year period. Its constitutionality was upheld in Morrison v. Olson.

On December 19, 1986, Lawrence Walsh was appointed Independent Counsel for Iran/Contra Matters by the Special Division.

References

Morrison v. Olson

United States Court of Appeals for the District of Columbia Circuit